Phantom Moon is the third album by American singer-songwriter Duncan Sheik. It was released on Nonesuch Records in 2001.

Recording

The album was a collaboration between Sheik and poet/playwright Steven Sater, who wrote the lyrics for the album. Phantom Moon is considered a tribute of sorts to Nick Drake and his album Pink Moon. The album features contributions from the London Session Orchestra, and from guitarist Bill Frisell. In addition, percussion is very spare, which helped create a mood of contemplation and spirituality that supports the lyrical content.

Release
The album was met with little commercial success, but favorable reviews. Review aggregating website Metacritic reports a normalized score of 76% based on 7 reviews. According to Allmusic, Phantom Moon is "easily Sheik's strongest, and most mature record to date". Rolling Stone wrote that the album "casts a lovely, languid shadow", while The New York Times wrote that it is "an album of moods to set you drifting and dreaming". Entertainment Weekly noted the album's "intimate lamentations", adding, "with one's feet up and headphones on, the strings suddenly shimmer, and the warm vocals soothe".

Track listing
All songs written by Steven Sater & Duncan Sheik.

 "The Wilderness" (Prelude) – 1:24
 "Longing Town" – 3:27
 "Mr. Chess" – 2:38
 "The Winds That Blow" – 3:04
 "Mouth on Fire" – 5:37
 "Sad Stephen's Song" – 6:28
 "Time and Good Fortune" – 4:43
 "Far Away" – 4:32
 "This Is How My Heart Heard" – 4:13
 "A Mirror in the Heart" – 4:08
 "Lo and Behold" – 5:13
 "Requiescat" – 3:58
 "The Wilderness" – 4:24

References 

2001 albums
Duncan Sheik albums
Nonesuch Records albums